Paul Gill (born 31 May 1963 in Greenfield, Lancashire) is an English former cricketer active from 1986 to 1987 who played for Leicestershire. He appeared in eight first-class matches as a righthanded batsman who kept wicket. He scored 68 runs with a highest score of 17 and completed 24 catches.

Notes

1963 births
English cricketers
Leicestershire cricketers
Living people